Arrête ton char... bidasse! is a 1977 French comedy film directed by Michel Gérard.

Plot
Four young Frenchmen have to do their military service in Germany. The strict discipline isn't to their liking. Each time they are allowed to leave the barracks they relish it and go out for adventures.

Cast and roles
 Darry Cowl – Colonel Lessard
 Pierre Tornade – Capitaine Marcus
 Robert Castel – Rodriguez
 Stéphane Hillel – Raoul
 Rémi Laurent – Francis
 Michel Bonnet – Adjudant Boutain
 Frédéric Duru – Caporal Benoît
 Anton Duschek – Bourgmestre
 Angelika Hauff – Maria's mother (credited as Angelica Hauff)
 Jacques Faber – Lieutenant Finclair
 Evelyne Kraft – Karin (credited as Evelyn Kraft)
 Michel Melki – Joël
 Olivia Pascal – Maria
 Philippe Ricci – Luc
 Hubert Berger

References

External links

1977 films
1977 comedy films
French comedy films
1970s French-language films
West German films
Films shot in Germany
Military humor in film
1970s French films